Christopher Ethan Maxwell (born 30 July 1990) is a Welsh professional footballer who plays as a goalkeeper for Blackpool. He has represented Wales at age group level but not in a full competitive international level meaning he is still eligible to represent England and Scotland via his ancestry.

Maxwell began his career at Wrexham where he made his professional debut 18 years old in the 2008–09 season before moving to newly promoted League club Fleetwood Town in May 2012. He made his Fleetwood Town and simultaneously his League debut during the 2013–14 season after successful loan spells at Wrexham and Cambridge United. Maxwell signed for Preston North End in May 2016, and has since played for Charlton Athletic and Hibernian on loan from Preston.

Maxwell has played internationally for Wales at under-21 level, and all other international age groups under-19, under-17 and under-16 schoolboys teams.

Youth football
Born in St Asaph, Maxwell began his career coming through Wrexham's youth system, and signed a one-year professional contract in June 2008, which was extended under the management of Dean Saunders in January 2009, keeping him at the club until May 2010.

Club career

Connah's Quay Nomads
Maxwell spent a six-month loan spell at Welsh Premier League team Connah's Quay Nomads during the 2008–09 season, making 20 appearances in all competitions, before being called back by Wrexham in January 2009.

Wrexham
In April 2009, Maxwell made his first team debut for Wrexham at the age of 18. He went on to start the remaining 3 league games of the 2008–09 season, claiming his first senior clean sheet on the last day of the season against Weymouth.

After playing all of their 2009–10 pre-season games, Maxwell was joined at Wrexham by the more experienced Sam Russell. After only four games of the season, new signing Russell was sidelined with a dislocated elbow, allowing Maxwell the opportunity to start.

Maxwell went on to play 21 consecutive games and kept 10 clean sheets during Russell's absence. His contribution was acknowledged when he agreed an extension to his contract keeping him at the club until the end of the 2010–11 season. Maxwell regained the place ahead of Russell to play the last nine games of the season keeping a further five clean sheets. A number of defensive club records were broken; clean sheets, goals conceded and the first season where no more than two goals were conceded in a single game. Maxwell was recognised for his performances with a number of fans awards, including being named the Wrexham Football Association 'young player of the season'.

During the 2010–11 pre-season, Maxwell was joined at Wrexham by the more experienced Scott Shearer, and found himself once again fighting for the starting place. Maxwell took over the position in the starting line up just 10 games into the new season and soon started to attract the attention of higher league clubs. He cemented his claim to the number one position when Shearer left the club during the January transfer window.

Wrexham managed a play-off spot, but lost out to Luton Town in the semi-final play-off games. Maxwell finished the season with a number of fans awards including the Wrexham Football Association 'young player of the season for the second year running.

Maxwell remained at Wrexham for the start of the 2011–12 season. After a frustrating season under new player manager Andy Morrell and starting only 11 times after losing the number one position to Joslain Mayebi, having been absent from the squad after being called up to the Wales under-21 side. He decided he wanted to leave the club and was subsequently released.

Fleetwood Town
Maxwell was immediately signed by newly promoted Football League newcomers, Fleetwood Town on 23 May 2012.

Return to Wrexham on loan

On Transfer deadline day in January 2013 Maxwell signed for his former club Wrexham on loan for the remainder of the 2012–13 season after first team goalkeeper Joslain Mayebi was ruled out with an injury for the rest of the season. Maxwell made his second Wrexham debut in a Conference Premier match away to Forest Green Rovers. In March 2013 Maxwell picked up his first career honour winning the FA Trophy at Wembley with Wrexham. Wrexham went on to play at Wembley a second time where they lost to Newport County in the Conference play off final.

Cambridge United loan
Maxwell signed for Cambridge United on loan until January 2014 and quickly established himself as part of the team. He was handed the number 1 shirt by manager Richard Money despite being on loan and made his team debut on the first day of the 2013–14 season with a win against F.C. Halifax Town. The season started with a 16-game unbeaten run. This was a club record and with 11 clean sheets, 6 of which were consecutive, another club league record was established. Maxwell was awarded the Conference Premier player of the month for October after keeping 5 clean sheets and not conceding throughout the month, this involved saving a penalty as Cambridge beat Grimsby Town1–0 at Blundell Park. His loan with Cambridge ended on 6 January 2014 and he returned to Fleetwood Town. During his loan period, Maxwell kept a total of 18 clean sheets and conceded only 10 times during 24 league games.

Return to Fleetwood Town
After Cambridge failed to secure Maxwell's services for the remainder of the season Maxwell again returned to Highbury to battle both Scott Davies and David Lucas for the number one spot. Maxwell finally made his club and simultaneously his Football League debut under new manager Graham Alexander away from home against Wycombe Wanderers in a 1–1 draw on 11 February 2014 Maxwell retained his place for the remainder of the season helping Fleetwood to a fourth-place finish and a place in the League Two play off finals. Maxwell kept a total of 11 clean sheets in 22 games for Fleetwood bringing his season total to 29 in 50 games with 24 in 41 competitive league games. Fleetwood went on to win the play-off final at Wembley on 26 May, beating Burton Albion 1–0 in normal time. Following Fleetwood's promotion to League One, Maxwell signed a two-year contract extension with Fleetwood until the summer of 2016.

Fleetwood made an impressive start to the 2014–15 season with 10 points from the first 4 games good enough to top the League One table. Maxwell continued collecting clean sheets with three consecutive shut outs and only conceding one goal from a penalty in the season opener against Crewe Alexandra. Maxwell continued as the club number one and played every game during the season helping Fleetwood finish in 10th equal on points with Rochdale in 8th place. Only the top three clubs had a better defensive record. Maxwell's efforts were recognised with a number of personal awards; Players Player, Supporters Player of the season and The Community Player of the season.

A change of strategic direction for the 2015–16 season saw the club fighting relegation for the entire season only securing League One status on the last day with a 2–0 win over already relegated Crewe Alexandra. Fleetwood eventually finish in 19th spot above relegated Fylde Coast rivals Blackpool. Despite being constantly in and out of the relegation zone only the top seven clubs had a better defensive record.

Maxwell's effort were recognised with a number of personal awards; The PFA Community Player of the season, the League One unsung hero award for April 2016 and was a finalist in the North West MBNA Football awards for the 2014–15 season.

Preston North End
On 16 May 2016, Maxwell signed for Championship side Preston North End on a three-year deal, commencing 1 July 2016. He found himself competing for a starting place with Anders Lindegaard who returned to Preston following a loan spell during the previous season, signing on a free transfer from West Brom.

Maxwell made his debut on 23 August in a 2–0 win against Oldham Athletic in the EFL Cup. He made his league debut on 23 September in a 1–0 win against Wigan Athletic. Maxwell replaced Lindegaard as first choice for the remainder of the 2016–17 season, and was rewarded with a contract extension to 2020. At the end of the season, he was named Community Player of season at the club's annual awards.

Declan Rudd was signed by Preston in June 2017, as competition for the number 1 spot. Maxwell secured the starting place for the first game of the 2017–18 season, but Rudd became the regular first choice.

On 2 October 2018, in a game against Aston Villa, with the score level at 3-3, he saved a last minute Glenn Whelan penalty to help his side earn a point. His last appearance for Preston was in a 1–1 draw at Ipswich Town later in October 2018, when he was sent off for two bookable offences.

Maxwell was released by Preston on 22 January 2020.

Charlton Athletic loan
On 8 January 2019, Maxwell signed for League One side Charlton Athletic on loan until the end of the 2018–19 season. Maxwell returned to Preston at the end of the season, without having made a first team appearance for Charlton.

Hibernian loan
Maxwell was loaned to Scottish Premiership club Hibernian in July 2019, with the arrangement due to run for the whole of the 2019–20 season. He began the season as deputy to Ofir Marciano who was dropped in September giving Maxwell his first-team chance.

Blackpool
Maxwell joined Blackpool on 24 January 2020, on a deal until the end of the season. He signed a new two-year contract at the end of the 2019–20 season, taking him until the summer of 2022. In December 2020 he tested positive for COVID-19 and had to self-isolate, missing matches.

Maxwell won the League One EFL Golden Glove for the 2020–21 season after keeping (as of the 4 May victory over Doncaster Rovers) 21 clean sheets. He was named in the League One PFA Team of the Year on 3 June.

On 22 July 2021, Maxwell signed a new two-year contract, with an option to extend by a further twelve months.

International career
Maxwell is eligible to play for three of the home nations, as he is Welsh by birth, has an English father and a Scottish grandfather. He was a member of the Wales U16 squad that won the 2005 Victory Shield, during the 2005–06 season, won his first U17 cap at the age of 15 and went on to win his first U19 cap at the age of just 16 and three days. During the 2008–09 season, Maxwell added a further two international age groups to his tally U23 semi professional and U21 honours both before his 19th birthday.

At the start of the 2009–10 season, Maxwell retained his place in the Wales U21 squad and played in all of Wales' Group 3 qualification games for the 2011 UEFA European Under-21 Football Championship. Maxwell continued as number 1 in the Wales U21 squad during 2010 and played in all of the remaining Wales' Group 3 qualification games for the 2011 UEFA European Under-21 Football Championship. Wales narrowly missed out on qualification for the next stage on an away goal rule to Italy. Maxwell continued to be a key member of the 2011–13 Wales U21 squad for qualification games in the 2013 UEFA European Under-21 Football Championship.

Maxwell was called into the senior side during the buildup to UEFA Euro 2016, due to an injury to Danny Ward. Maxwell remained with the squad during preparations but did not make the final squad when Ward made a full recovery.

Career statistics

Honours
Wrexham
FA Trophy: 2012–13

Fleetwood Town
Football League Two play-offs: 2014

Charlton Athletic
EFL League One play-offs: 2019

Blackpool
EFL League One play-offs: 2021

Wales U16
Victory Shield: 2005

Individual
Wrexham Football Association 'young player of the season'2009–10.
Wrexham Football Association 'young player of the season'2010–11.
Conference Premier Player of the Month: October 2013
Fleetwood Town Players' Player of the Season: 2014–15
Fleetwood Town Supporters' Player of the Season: 2014–15
Fleetwood Town Community Player of the Season: 2014–15
Fleetwood Town The PFA Community Player of the Season and Skybet league 1 unsung hero award for April: 2015–16
Preston North End Community Player of the season 2016–17
EFL League One Golden Glove: 2020–21
PFA Team of the Year: 2020–21 League One

References

External links

Living people
1990 births
Sportspeople from St Asaph
Welsh footballers
Welsh people of English descent
Welsh people of Scottish descent
Wales youth international footballers
Wales under-21 international footballers
Association football goalkeepers
Wrexham A.F.C. players
Fleetwood Town F.C. players
Cambridge United F.C. players
Preston North End F.C. players
Charlton Athletic F.C. players
Hibernian F.C. players
Blackpool F.C. players
English Football League players
National League (English football) players
Cymru Premier players
Scottish Professional Football League players